Pinheiro Machado ("José Gomes Pinheiro Machado - Brazilian politician") is a bairro in the District of Sede in the municipality of Santa Maria, in the Brazilian state of Rio Grande do Sul. It is located in west Santa Maria.

Villages 
The bairro contains the following villages: Loteamento Bela Vista, Parque Residencial Pinheiro Machado, Parque Residencial Lopes, Pinheiro Machado, Vila Ecologia, Vila Rossi, Vila São Serafim.

Gallery of photos

References 

Bairros of Santa Maria, Rio Grande do Sul